Hal Crook (born 28 July 1950 in Providence, Rhode Island) is a jazz trombonist. He has a degree from the Berklee College of Music and is considered to be a leading teacher and author in the field of jazz improvisation.

Hal was a professor at Berklee College of Music for 30 years, and has played on over 40 recordings.  Some of his notable students include Esperanza Spaulding, Leo Genovese, Antonio Sanchez, Lionel Loueke, and Chris Cheek.  Hal's composing and arranging credits include music for The Tonight Show Band, WDR Radio Band (Cologne), Phil Woods, Clark Terry, Herb Pomeroy, Louis Bellson, Artie Shaw, Duke Belaire, Dick Johnson, Nick Brignola, the New England Emmy Awards, and the San Diego Pops.

In Jazz 'Bones, Kurt Dietrich writes:

He is the author of seven textbooks on jazz improvisation, a novel (A Brief Madness), and a collection of short stories (Windborne Tales).

Though retired from Berklee, he continues to teach privately.

Discography 
 Hello Heaven (1982)
 Only Human (1993)
 Quartet Narayani with Joe Diorio (Ram 1994)
 Hero Worship (1997)
 Um: Stray Dog (2001)
 Creatures of Habit with Leo Genovese, Take Toriyama, and Thompson Kneeland
 Narayani with Joe Diorio, Steve LaSpina, and Steve Bagby
 Conjunction with Jerry Bergonzi
 Trio I with Dave Weigert and Yorai Oron
 Trio II with Dave Weigert and Hans Glawischnig
 Trio III with Dave Weigert and Hans Glawschnig
 Hello Heaven with Phil Woods, Bill Dobbins, Chuck Israels, and Bill Goodwin
 Creative Comping for Improvisation, Vol. I, II, III

References

External links
Hal Crook Website

1950 births
Living people
Berklee College of Music alumni
Berklee College of Music faculty
American jazz trombonists
Male trombonists
Ropeadope Records artists
21st-century trombonists
21st-century American male musicians
American male jazz musicians
The Tonight Show Band members